The military ground snake (Erythrolamprus miliaris) is a species of snake in the family Colubridae. The species is endemic to South America.

Common names
South American common names for E. miliaris include cobra-d'água (water snake) and cobra-lisa (smooth snake) in Portuguese, and simply culebra (snake) in Spanish.

Taxonomy
E. miliaris was originally described as Coluber miliaris by Carl Linnaeus in 1758.

Subspecies
Five subspecies are recognized, including the nominotypical subspecies.
Erythrolamprus miliaris amazonicus (Dunn, 1922)
Erythrolamprus miliaris chrysostomus (Cope, 1868)
Erythrolamprus miliaris merremi (Wied, 1821)
Erythrolamprus miliaris miliaris (Linnaeus, 1758)
Erythrolamprus miliaris orinus (Griffin, 1916)

The subspecific name, merremi is in honor of German herpetologist Blasius Merrem.

Liophis milaris intermedius, a taxonomic error
In 1991, Erythrolamprus miliaris intermedius was described by Henle and Ehrl. However, they made a mistake. It was later discovered by Dixon and Tipton, through various comparisons of morphometrics, that Erythrolamprus miliaris intermedius was actually Erythrolamprus reginae.

Geographic range
E. miliaris is found in South America east of the Andes, from the Guyanas south to Paraguay. The former subspecies extending further south (southeastern Brazil, Paraguay, Uruguay and northeastern Argentina) is now recognized as a full species, Erythrolamprus semiaureus.

Physical characteristics
E. miliaris is stout-bodied (muscular) and relatively short-tailed. Tail length/total length ratios vary from 15.0%–19.8% with an average of 18.6%.

Adults may attain a total length (including tail) of about 50 cm (about 20 in).

Dorsally, it is pale olive-brown or yellowish, with each smooth dorsal scale edged with black. Ventrally, it is uniformly yellow.

Feeding
E. miliaris feeds on a wide range of prey items. They include primarily amphibians (including eggs and tadpoles), but also fish and even lizards and small rodents. Invertebrates have also been reported but may have been secondarily ingested. However, there is little information on its feeding habits. A study indicated that females with oviductal eggs did not feed, whereas those females with secondary vitellogenic follicles fed more often than did the non-reproductive ones.

Sexual dimorphism
There is sexual dimorphism with respect to size of adult Erythrolamprus miliaris. Adult females are larger in the subspecies merremi and orinus. They were seen to be larger than the adult males. The sexual dimorphism index was seen to be similar in the geographic areas of the northern coastal Atlantic forest, southern coastal Atlantic forest, northern inland Atlantic forest and southern inland Atlantic forest. This was indicative of no geographic variation in sexual size dimorphism. It is believed that body size may differ either because of local genetic modification or direct phenotypic effect of food availability on the growth rates. In addition to body size, the comparison of head size in E. miliaris is seen to show no dimorphism. Head size is considered to be associated with inter-sexual dietary divergence.

Reproductive output
With respect to reproductive output in the northern and southern coast Atlantic forest, and the northern and southern inland forest, the reproductive output recorded for Erythrolamprus miliaris orinus and Erythrolamprus miliaris merremi were determined via number of eggs, size of eggs, and number of neonates. The mean egg volume in the southern coast Atlantic forest was seen to be the largest of the four regions. The reproductive frequency was lower in the northern coast Atlantic forest than the other regions.

Parasitism
Parasitism is not understood very well in the context of snake ecology. The only inferences that have been made are those with the influence on natural populations. It is thought to be related to the snakes feeding behavior and immunological resistance. Two parasites were discovered in the subspecies orinus and merremi. The first were adults of the nematod Ophidiascaris sp. in the stomach. Also cystacaths of the acanthocephalan Oligatanthorynchus spira were in the peritoneum. The prevalence found in the four different regions, northern and southern coastal Atlantic forest and northern and southern inland Atlantic forest, were observed in Pizatto's and Marques' study. The lowest prevalence was seen in the northern coastal Atlantic forest. The level of parasite infestation did not differ between the males and females. Female reproductive status was unaffected by the level of infection, nor was the number of eggs she carried. The male reproductive system was unaffected by the level of infestation as well.

Habitat
Erythrolamprus miliaris inhabits aquatic and riparian habitats. It occurs in both lowland tropical rainforest and Atlantic forest at elevations below .

References

Further reading
Linnaeus C (1758). Systema naturæ per regna tria naturæ, secundum classes, ordines, genera, species, cum characteribus, differentiis, synonymis, locis. Tomus I. Editio Decima, Reformata. Stockholm: L. Salvius. 824 pp. (Coluber miliaris, new species, p. 220). (in Latin).
Wied M (1821). Reise nach Brasilien in den Jahren 1815 bis 1817. Zweyter Band [volume 2]. Frankfurt: H.L.Brönner. xviii + 345 pp. (Coluber merremii, new species, p. 121). (in German).

miliaris
Snakes of South America
Reptiles of Bolivia
Reptiles of Brazil
Reptiles of Colombia
Reptiles of Ecuador
Reptiles of French Guiana
Reptiles of Guyana
Reptiles of Paraguay
Reptiles of Peru
Reptiles of Suriname
Reptiles of Venezuela
Fauna of the Atlantic Forest
Reptiles described in 1758
Taxa named by Carl Linnaeus